Henry Garrett is an English actor. He studied at New York's Lee Strasberg acting studio.

Career
Garrett played the recurring role of Captain McNeil in the first two series of BBC's Poldark. He played Pete McCullough in the main cast of AMC's The Son.

Filmography

Film

Television

References

External links
 

Living people
21st-century English male actors
English male film actors
English male television actors
Male actors from Bristol
Year of birth missing (living people)